Pilophoropsis is a genus of plant bugs in the family Miridae. There are about seven described species in Pilophoropsis.

Species
These seven species belong to the genus Pilophoropsis:
 Pilophoropsis bejeanae Henry, 2015
 Pilophoropsis brachyptera Poppius, 1914
 Pilophoropsis brachypterus Poppius, 1914
 Pilophoropsis cunealis Henry, 2015
 Pilophoropsis nicholi (Knight, 1927)
 Pilophoropsis quercicola Henry, 2015
 Pilophoropsis texana (Knight)

References

Further reading

 
 
 
 

Miridae genera
Articles created by Qbugbot
Ceratocapsini